The men's 100m breaststroke events at the 2022 World Para Swimming Championships were held at the Penteada Olympic Swimming Complex in Madeira between 12–18 June.

Medalists

Results

SB4
Final
Eight swimmers from seven nations took part.

SB5

SB6

SB8

SB9

SB11

SB12
Final
Five swimmers from five nations took part.

SB13

References

2022 World Para Swimming Championships